Love of a Clown, or  Pagliacci, is a 1948 Italian film based on Ruggero Leoncavallo's opera Pagliacci, directed by Mario Costa. The film stars Tito Gobbi and Gina Lollobrigida. It recounts the tragedy of Canio, the lead clown (or pagliaccio in Italian) in a commedia dell'arte troupe, his wife Nedda, and her lover, Silvio. When Nedda spurns the advances of Tonio, another player in the troupe, he tells Canio about Nedda's betrayal. In a jealous rage Canio murders both Nedda and Silvio. The only actor in the cast who also sang his role was the celebrated Italian baritone, Tito Gobbi, but the film is largely very faithful to its source material, presenting the opera nearly complete.

The film premiered on 16 April 1950 in the USA. It is notable for having been filmed largely in outdoor settings, much like a big-budgeted film version of a Broadway musical.

Plot

Cast
Tito Gobbi as  Tonio, the hunchback / Silvio
Gina Lollobrigida as Nedda, wife of Canio
Onelia Fineschi as  Nedda (singing voice)
Afro Poli as Canio, master of the troupe
Galliano Masini as  Canio (singing voice)
Filippo Morucci as Beppe, troupe harlequin
Gino Sinimberghi as  Beppe (singing voice)

Sources
 

1948 films
1948 musical films
Italian musical films
1940s Italian-language films
Italian black-and-white films
Films based on operas
Films set in the 1860s
Films about theatre
Films about clowns
Opera films
Films directed by Mario Costa
1940s Italian films